Ornithocephalus is a genus of orchids comprising more than 50 known species widespread in South America, Central America, Southern Mexico, Trinidad and the Windward Islands.

Species accepted as of June 2014:

Ornithocephalus alfredoi Archila & Chiron
Ornithocephalus archilarum Chiron
Ornithocephalus aristatus Pupulin & Dressler
Ornithocephalus aurorae D.E.Benn. & Christenson
Ornithocephalus bicornis Lindl. in G.Bentham
Ornithocephalus biloborostratus Salazar & R.González
Ornithocephalus bonitensis (Dodson) Toscano
Ornithocephalus brachyceras G.A.Romero & Carnevali
Ornithocephalus brachystachyus Schltr.
Ornithocephalus bryostachyus Schltr.
Ornithocephalus cascajalensis Archila
Ornithocephalus castelfrancoi Pupulin
Ornithocephalus caveroi D.E.Benn. & Christenson
Ornithocephalus ciliatus Lindl.
Ornithocephalus cochleariformis C.Schweinf.
Ornithocephalus cryptanthus (C.Schweinf. & P.H.Allen) Toscano & Dressler.
Ornithocephalus cujeticola Barb.Rodr.
Ornithocephalus dalstroemii (Dodson) Toscano & Dressler
Ornithocephalus dodsonii R.Vásquez & T.Krömer
Ornithocephalus dolabratus Rchb.f.
Ornithocephalus dressleri (Toscano) Toscano & Dressler
Ornithocephalus dunstervillei Toscano & Carnevali
Ornithocephalus ecuadorensis (Garay) Toscano & Dressler
Ornithocephalus escobarianus (Garay) Toscano & Dressler
Ornithocephalus estradae Dodson
Ornithocephalus falcatus Focke
Ornithocephalus garayi (D.E.Benn. & Christenson) Toscano & Dressler
Ornithocephalus gladiatus Hook.
Ornithocephalus grex-anserinus Dressler & Mora-Ret.
Ornithocephalus hoppii (Schltr.) Toscano & Dressler
Ornithocephalus inflexus Lindl.
Ornithocephalus iridifolius Rchb.f. in W.G.Walpers
Ornithocephalus kalbreyerianus Kraenzl.
Ornithocephalus lankesteri Ames
Ornithocephalus lehmannii Schltr.
Ornithocephalus longilabris Schltr.
Ornithocephalus manabina Dodson
Ornithocephalus micranthus Schltr.
Ornithocephalus minimiflorus Senghas
Ornithocephalus montealegreae Pupulin
Ornithocephalus myrticola Lindl.
Ornithocephalus numenius Toscano & Dressler
Ornithocephalus obergiae Soto Arenas
Ornithocephalus oberonioides (Schltr.) Toscano & Dressler
Ornithocephalus patentilobus C.Schweinf.
Ornithocephalus polyodon Rchb.f.
Ornithocephalus powellii Schltr.
Ornithocephalus suarezii Dodson
Ornithocephalus torresii Salazar & Soto Arenas
Ornithocephalus tripterus Schltr.
Ornithocephalus tsubotae (P.Ortiz) Toscano & Dressler
Ornithocephalus urceilabris (P.Ortiz & R.Escobar) Toscano & Dressler
Ornithocephalus valerioi Ames & C.Schweinf.
Ornithocephalus vasquezii Dodson
Ornithocephalus zamoranus Dodson

References

External links

 
Oncidiinae genera